Alexandrovka is a rural locality (a settlement) in Alexeyevsky Selsoviet, Blagoveshchensky District, Altai Krai, Russia. The population was 40 as of 2013. There is 1 street.

Geography 
Alexandrovka is located 61 km east of Blagoveshchenka (the district's administrative centre) by road. Alexeyevka is the nearest rural locality.

References 

Rural localities in Blagoveshchensky District, Altai Krai